Lord Ryder could refer to:

 Richard Ryder, Baron Ryder of Wensum (born 1949), a British politician
 Don Ryder, Baron Ryder of Eaton Hastings, (1913–2003), a British businessman